Northampton Greyhound Stadium was a greyhound racing and speedway stadium located on what was South Bridge Road, Northampton, Northamptonshire, East Midlands (modern day New South Bridge Road).

Origins
The stadium was constructed on the north side of South Bridge Road on the south bank of the River Nene and on the west side of the Bedford and Northampton branch railway line.

Greyhound racing
The opening meeting was held on 7 April 1928 and the racing was independent (not affiliated to the sports governing body the National Greyhound Racing Club).

The stadium was run by the Northampton Greyhound Racing Association and racing was held every Thursday and Saturday. A narrow boat was pulled across the South Quay of the River Nene for people to use as a way of getting to the venue.

Speedway
The venue held speedway during 1929 and 1930.

Closure
The final meeting was held on 31 October 1964  because a company called Greenoughs bought the stadium and converted it into a wallpaper and paint depot.

References

Defunct greyhound racing venues in the United Kingdom
Defunct speedway venues in England
Defunct sports venues in Northamptonshire
Sports venues completed in 1928
Sports venues in Northampton